Thomas Clausen may refer to:

Thomas Clausen (educator) (1939–2002), educator from Baton Rouge, Louisiana
Thomas Clausen (musician) (born 1949), Danish jazz pianist
Thomas Clausen (mathematician) (1801–1885), Danish mathematician and astronomer

See also 
Clausen